Godiva is the debut album by Godiva, released September 22, 2003. The album is produced by Tom Naumann, who is most famous for his work with Primal Fear.

Track listing
"Tha Gate" (Mitch Koontz, Peter Gander) - 1:01
"Razorblade Romantic" (Sammy Lasagni, Anthony de Angelis) - 4:37
"Heavy Metal Thunder" (Lasagni, de Angelis) - 4:54
"One Shot" (Koontz, Tom Naumann, de Angelis) - 4:01
"Nightmare" (Lasagni, de Angelis, Koontz, Gander) - 4:53
"Cold Blood" (Koontz, Naumann, de Angelis) - 4:30
"Where Angels Die" (Naumann, de Angelis) - 4:29
"Riding Through Time" (Lasagni, Koontz, Gander) - 5:07
"Let the Tanks Roll" (Lasagni, de Angelis) - 4:35
"Bullshit Lover" (Koontz, Gander, de Angelis) - 3:03
"Sinner" (Koontz, Gander) - 3:45

Personnel

Band members
Anthony de Angelis - vocals
Sammy Lasagni - guitars
Mitch Koontz - bass, backing vocals
Peter Gander - drums

Additional musicians
Klaus Sperling - drums on "Where Angels Die"

References

2003 debut albums
Limb Music albums